Nizhniye Buzuli is a rural locality (a selo) and the administrative center of Nizhnebuzulinsky Selsoviet of Svobodnensky District, Amur Oblast, Russia. The population is 1,000 as of 2018.

Geography 
The village is located on the bank of the Buzulka River, 30 km north from Svobodny.

References 

Rural localities in Svobodnensky District